The 2020–21 Drexel Dragons women's basketball team will represent Drexel University during the 2020–21 NCAA Division I women's basketball season. The Dragons, led by first-year head coach Amy Mallon, will play their home games at the Daskalakis Athletic Center in Philadelphia, Pennsylvania as members of the Colonial Athletic Association.

Previous season

Offseason

Departures

Incoming transfers

2020 recruiting class

Roster

Schedule and results

|-
!colspan=12 style=| Non-conference regular season
|-

|-
!colspan=12 style=| CAA regular season
|-

|-
!colspan=12 style=| CAA Tournament
|-

|-
!colspan=12 style=| NCAA tournament
|-

Awards
Kate Connolly
CAA All-Tournament Team

Hannah Nihill
CAA Defensive Player of the Year
CAA All-Conference First Team
CAA All-Defensive Team
CAA Dean Ehlers Leadership Award
CAA All-Tournament Team

Keishana Washington
CAA All-Conference Third Team
CAA Tournament Most Outstanding Player
CAA All-Tournament Team

See also
 2020–21 Drexel Dragons men's basketball team

References

Drexel Dragons women's basketball seasons
Drexel
Drexel
Drexel
Drexel